(born 8 August 1908, date of death unknown) was a Japanese wrestler. He competed in the men's Greco-Roman lightweight at the 1932 Summer Olympics.

References

External links
 

1908 births
Year of death missing
Japanese male sport wrestlers
Olympic wrestlers of Japan
Wrestlers at the 1932 Summer Olympics
Place of birth missing
20th-century Japanese people